The fourth season of the American television drama series Empire premiered on September 27, 2017, in the United States on Fox. The fourth season was ordered on January 11, 2017, consisting of eighteen episodes. The show is produced by 20th Century Fox Television, in association with Imagine Entertainment, Lee Daniels Entertainment, Danny Strong Productions and Little Chicken Inc. The showrunners for this season are Ilene Chaiken, Danny Strong and Lee Daniels. The season aired on Wednesdays at 8:00 pm, a new slot. The premiere of the season also had a crossover with other Lee Daniels-created Fox series Star. The season concluded on May 23, 2018.

Premise
The show centers around a hip hop music and entertainment company, Empire Entertainment, and the drama among the members of the founders' family as they fight for control of the company. After the explosive season 3 finale, Lucious has lost his memory and his family is trying to help him regain it, with the uncomfortable assistance from Nurse Claudia. The storyline also includes the war between the Lyons and the Dubois with Warren falling in love with Jamal, Andre receiving prescriptions from his psychiatrist and Hakeem meeting with Diana on a three week basis until disaster strikes.

Cast and characters

Main cast
 Terrence Howard as Lucious Lyon
 Taraji P. Henson as Cookie Lyon
 Bryshere Y. Gray as Hakeem Lyon
 Jussie Smollett as Jamal Lyon
 Trai Byers as Andre Lyon
 Grace Byers as Anika Calhoun
 Gabourey Sidibe as Becky Williams
 Ta'Rhonda Jones as Porsha Taylor
 Serayah as Tiana Brown
 Xzibit as Shyne Johnson
 Rumer Willis as Tory Ash
 Terrell Carter as Warren Hall 
 Andre Royo as Thirsty Rawlings

Recurring cast
 Forest Whitaker as Eddie Barker
 Vivica A. Fox as Candace Holloway
 Demi Moore as Nurse Claudia
 Leslie Uggams as Leah Walker
 Taye Diggs as Angelo DuBois
 Phylicia Rashad as Diana DuBois
 Teyonah Parris as Detective Pamela Rose
 Charles D. Clark as Shyne's Main Goon
 V. Bozeman as Veronica
 Mo McRae as J Poppa
 Pej Vahdat as Kelly Patel
 Lizzy Leigh as Employee
 Chet Hanks as Blake
 Nicole Ari Parker as Giselle Barker 
 Tasha Smith as Carol Holloway
 Alfre Woodard as Renee Holloway

Guest cast
 Queen Latifah as Carlotta Brown
 Funkmaster Flex as himself  
 Tisha Campbell-Martin as Brooke 
 Rhyon Nicole Brown as Maya  
 Cassie Ventura as Haven Quinn
 Sierra McClain as Nessa Parker
 Magic Johnson as himself
 Eve as herself
 Kaitlin Doubleday as Rhonda Lyon

Episodes

Reception

Ratings

References

2017 American television seasons
2018 American television seasons
Empire (2015 TV series) seasons